This is a list of notable Old Derbeians, former pupils and masters of Derby School (from the 12th century to 1989) and of Derby Grammar School (since 1994), in Derby, England.

Notable old boys

Born in the 16th century
 Blessed Edward James (1557–1588), Roman Catholic martyr
John Cotton (1585–1652), New England Puritan

Born in the 17th century
George Sitwell (c.1600-1667), Ironmaster and High Sheriff
John Flamsteed (1646–1719), England's first Astronomer Royal
Anthony Blackwall (1672–1730), classical scholar
Henry Cantrell (1684–1773), clergyman and religious controversialist
William Budworth (c. 1699–1745), schoolmaster

Born in the 18th century
Sir John Eardley Wilmot (1709–1792), Chief Justice of the Common Pleas
Joseph Wright (1734–1797), artist
Daniel Coke (1745–1825), barrister and member of parliament
Alleyne FitzHerbert, 1st Baron St Helens (1753–1839), diplomat
Joseph Strutt (1765–1844), cotton manufacturer and philanthropist
Sir William Gell (1777–1836), archaeologist

Born in the 19th century
Sir Francis Seymour Haden (1818–1910), surgeon and artist
Henry Howe Bemrose (1827–1911), member of parliament for Derby
Unwin Sowter (1839–1910), maltster, cricketer and Mayor of Derby
John Cook Wilson (1849–1915), philosopher
J. M. J. Fletcher (1850–1934), historian
Frank Styant Browne, chemist and photographer
E. W. Hobson FRS (1856–1933), mathematician
Richard Mansfield (1857–1907), actor
John Atkinson Hobson (1858–1940), social theorist and economist
Walter Weston (1860–1940), missionary and mountaineer
Frederic Creswell (1866–1948), mining engineer and South African Minister of Defence
Christopher Wilson (1874-1919), composer of theatre music and author, Shakespeare and Music (1922) 
Lawrence Beesley (1877–1967), RMS Titanic survivor and author
William Henry Ansell (1872–1959), architect, President of the Royal Institute of British Architects from 1940 to 1943
Walter Greatorex (1877–1949), composer
Charles Tate Regan (1878–1943), ichthyologist
Sir George Simpson FRS (1878–1965), meteorologist
Geoffrey Shaw (1879–1943), composer and musician
Guy Wilson (1882–1917), cricketer and soldier
William George Constable (1887–1976), art historian
Frank Conroy (1890–1964), actor
Robert Howe (1893–1981), last British Governor-General of the Sudan, 1947-1955
 Ernest Sterndale Bennett (1884-1982), Theatre Director and member of the Order of Canada

Born in the 20th century
Max Bemrose (1904–1986), Chairman of Bemrose Corporation and High Sheriff of Derbyshire
George Timms (1910–1997), clergyman 
P. G. Ashmore (1916–2002), academic chemist
Gilbert Hodgkinson (1913–1987), cricketer
Spencer Barrett (1914–2001), classical scholar, Fellow and Sub-Warden of Keble College, Oxford
George Bacon (1917-2011), nuclear physicist
Ted Moult (1926–1986), farmer & TV personality
Alexander Morrison (1927-2012), judge
John Stobart (born 1929), maritime artist
Robert Grimley (born 1943), Dean of Bristol since 1997

Notable masters of Derby School
John Meade Falkner, novelist and poet
Rev. Robert de Courcy Laffan (Senior Classical Master, 1880–1884), principal of Cheltenham College, member of the International Olympic Committee
Henry Judge Hose (Maths master, 1867–1874), mathematician

See also
Derby School
List of Masters of Derby School
:Category:People educated at Derby School
Derby Grammar School

References

Sources
Derby School: a Short History by George Percy Gollin

 
Derby
Derbyshire-related lists